The Dodge Aspen, and the nearly-identical Plymouth Volaré, are compact cars that were produced from 1976 until 1980. The Volaré/Aspen model line offered a four-door sedan, a two-door coupe, and a four-door wagon.

During the time that the Volaré and the Aspen were produced, North American automakers were actively "downsizing" their lineups, reducing size and weight for improved fuel economy. For that reason, the rear-wheel-drive Volaré and the Aspen were originally classified as compact cars, but were considered intermediate-sized cars by the end of their production run.

The Volaré/Aspen were discontinued following the 1980 model year just prior to the introduction of the front-wheel-drive Plymouth Reliant and Dodge Aries, known collectively as K-cars.

Background 
The Volaré and the Aspen were introduced in the middle of the 1976 model year. They were the successors to the Chrysler Corporation "A-platform" models, the Plymouth Valiant/Plymouth Duster and the Dodge Dart. During the 1976 model year, Valiant/Duster models were sold alongside the Volaré at Chrysler/Plymouth dealerships, and the Dart models were sold alongside the Aspen at Dodge dealerships. After the 1976 model year, the Valiant and Dart models were discontinued.

With the Plymouth Volaré and Dodge Aspen models, Chrysler Corporation hoped to offer consumers modern, fuel-efficient cars that seemed to be more luxurious and desirable than the dated Plymouth Valiant and Dodge Dart predecessors. And, at launch, hopes were high: the Volaré/Aspen were collectively named Motor Trend's Car of the Year for 1976, and they were hailed by Consumer Reports magazine for their modern design and good performance. However, the Volaré and Aspen suffered from numerous quality problems, frequent product recalls, and early rusting damage that ruined the cars' reputations and hampered sales.

Production history 

During development, the Volaré/Aspen models were extensively wind-tunnel tested to be aerodynamically sound. This was done to improve fuel economy through reduced wind drag, improve crosswind stability, reduce wind noise, and increase interior ventilation performance. This testing led Chrysler Corporation designers to soften the front end contours of the Volaré/Aspen, remove their roof-drip moldings, and offer improved internal airflow ducting. Body engineering for the Volaré/Aspen was aided with computer technology, as well as the use of clear plastic stress models. These models helped to reveal stress points in the design phase before any sheet metal was formed. Weight reduction to provide improved fuel economy was achieved with thinner glass, lighter side door beams, and high-strength/low alloy steel (HSLA) brackets and reinforcements that reduced weight, yet were four times as strong as conventional mild steel. In addition, a reduced number of steel stampings offered better sheet metal panel fits with fewer welds needed. Larger glass areas gave the new models improved visibility over their predecessors; the vehicles offered a total glass area increase of 25% on two-door models and 33% on sedans.

For the new models, the Chrysler Corporation introduced the Isolated Transverse Suspension System; this new front suspension system used torsion bars that crossed and were mounted transversely beneath the engine, a noticeable change from the longitudinal torsion bar suspension that Chrysler had introduced in 1957 and had used on all models up to that time. This new transverse torsion bar system was not as geometrically favorable as its predecessor, but it saved space and weight. In addition, the new front suspension system was touted as giving a "big car ride" as the suspension had a low, or softer, fore-and-aft compliance. This allowed the wheels to move rearward, instead of straight up and down, when the tires encountered an object, thereby dampening the blow and "rolling with" the bump rather than resisting it. The two transverse torsion bars were mounted along with an anti-sway bar forward of the front wheels, integrating both into a spring-strut front suspension. These components were attached to a K-shaped structural cross member, which itself was isolated from the unitized car body by four rubber mounts. The steering column was also rubber-isolated. Wheel alignment adjustments such as caster and camber could be made by removing plates over the wheel housings. Chrysler Corporation also employed the Isolated Transverse Suspension System with their M- and J-platform models.

The rear suspension of the Volaré/Aspen was more traditional for Chrysler Corporation passenger cars, as it used a conventional leaf spring (semi-elliptical) suspension system. However, this leaf spring arrangement was also rubber-isolated, which eliminated a metal-to-metal path through which road noise or vibration could be transmitted to the body.

Several 1976 Dodge Aspen sedans served as test vehicles for a gas turbine engine installation, in a project sponsored by the United States Department of Energy. Testing began in August 1976. This new turbine engine was a smaller version of Chrysler Corporation's earlier turbine engine. At the time, the hope was that turbine engines would be cleaner and more efficient than comparably powerful V8 engines, but numerous technical challenges eventually put an end to turbine engine development for automotive applications.

Marketing 
According to R. M. "Ham" Schirmer, manager of Dodge car and corporate advertising for Chrysler, the "Aspen" name originated from the codename "Aspen-Vail" when development for it and the Plymouth "sister car" began in 1971. "Aspen is a very pleasant name", Schirmer said, "people think of the outdoors, but not necessarily skiing when they hear it ... it won't inhibit where we want to position the car because it's basically neutral." Nonetheless, Chrysler sponsored the 1976 Dodge Aspen Team K2 Freestyle and opened up World Pro Skiing's seventh season, in Aspen, Colorado, as the Dodge Aspen Cup, running courses on Aspen Highlands and Aspen Mountain. Actor Rex Harrison served as pitchman in an advertising campaign for the Dodge Aspen that was inspired by the "Ascot Gavotte" scene in the 1964 movie My Fair Lady, which starred Harrison. In TV and radio advertisements, Harrison performed a "patter song" using the word "unbelievable" spoken in rhythm. 

The "Volaré" name is Spanish for "I will fly away" or "I will blow away"; it is also Italian for "to fly". In print and broadcast media, singer Sergio Franchi was featured in Volaré advertisements. Franchi sang the pop song "Volare", with altered lyrics, in TV and radio commercials for the car. (The accent mark used in the car's name is not in the Italian word or the song title; Volaré commercials described it as an "accent on quality".)

1976 

As replacements for the venerable Plymouth Valiant and Dodge Dart, the Volaré/Aspen twins shared the same engine and transmission choices and three-box body style with their predecessors, but not much else.

Available as a four-door wagon, four-door sedan or a two-door coupe, Volaré/Aspen models came in three trim levels: The base model, the "custom" (for both models), and the "Premier" for the Volaré and "SE" (special edition) for the Aspen. 

In their introductory year, the Volaré and the Aspen differed only in their rear taillight styling, front grill and parking light location, and location of their side trim strips (lower for the Volaré, higher for the Aspen). Their interiors were completely identical and lacked any kind of branding or differentiation as it was not possible to tell from inside the car whether it was a Volaré or an Aspen. Body styles, engine and transmission options, colors, trim options, and other features were identical.

Coupes featured frameless door glass but—likely to improve rollover safety—a thick "B" pillar was used, replacing the popular hardtop body style of the Valiant and Dart. The "performance" packages (Road Runner for the Volaré, R/T for the Aspen) were available only on two-door models; they featured mostly trim items and heavy duty suspension systems. The standard engine was Chrysler's  slant six, and was available with a single-barrel carburetor. Optional engines were a  V8 or a  V8, both with two-barrel carburetors. 

Total production was 189,900 (Aspen) and 255,008 (Volaré).

1977 
The second model year for the Volaré/Aspen was mostly a carryover, but there were some significant changes. The standard  slant-six engine was supplemented by an optional "Super Six" version that employed a two-barrel carburetor; this setup had previously been available in Australian and Latin American markets roughly ten years prior. Along with improved performance, this option also helped with the poor driveability problems that plagued the 1976 models. A new T-top removable roof panel option was available for the coupe. Both the Volaré and the Aspen coupe models also offered "performance" appearance packages that consisted of front and rear spoilers, wheel opening flares, and louvered rear windows; the Volaré Road Runner package called these additional options the "Fun Runner" options, while the Aspen R/T package called these additions the "Super Pak" option. 

The Plymouth Volaré was Canada's top-selling car this year. Total production was 327,739 (Volaré) and 266,012 (Aspen).

1978 

The trim line arrangement was changed for 1978. Instead of having separate base, custom, and high-line Volaré premier/Aspen SE models, there was simply the base model, to which the buyer could add custom and premier/SE option packages. For their third production year, the Volaré and Aspen received their first visual update in the form of new front grille and fascia treatments. Starting with the 1978 model year, the standard three-speed manual transmission was no longer available with its shift lever mounted on the steering column; both the standard three-speed and the four-speed overdrive transmissions were only available with their shift levers mounted on the floor. New performance and trim packages for both models included the Volaré "kit car" and the Aspen "super coupe", which combined performance trim with the  V8, but the six-cylinder engine was standard.

The Volaré "kit car", made in honor of NASCAR legend Richard Petty, was supposed to look as much like a race car as possible. The wheels had no hubcaps, the wheel opening flares had a bolted-on look, and even the windshield had metal tie-downs just like the race cars. Unlike a race car, the kit car came standard with an automatic transmission. A special addition was a decal kit with large door mountable "43" decals and "360" decals for the hood. These decals were shipped in the trunk either to be installed by the dealer or by the owner. It was available in blue or red. A total of 145 were built. 

The Aspen super coupe included GR60x15 Goodyear GT radial tires on 15x8-inch wheels, a heavy-duty suspension with a rear sway bar, and a matte black finish on the hood. It was available in only one color: sable tan sunfire metallic. Special three-color (orange, yellow, and red) stripes separated the body color from the matte black colors. A total of 494 were built. 

Wider tail light lenses with amber turn signals replaced the previous all-red lenses on Volaré and Aspen coupes and sedans. 

For the 1978 model year, sales were down over 30% from 1977; total production came to 166,419 (Aspen) and 217,795 (Volaré).

1979 
The 1979 model year saw few changes. The only visible difference was the replacement of the amber rear turn signals with red ones. For the Volaré, a new coupe-only "Duster" trim package mirrored the Aspen "Sunrise" package, consisting mainly of new stripes and louvered rear windows. The 1978 option packages continued into 1979, with the exception of the super coupe and kit car options. A federally-mandated maximum  speedometer, new colors, and a diagnostic connector for the engine were added. Station wagon models were available with a "sport package" (Volaré) or as a "sport wagon" (Aspen) with special stripes, a front air dam, and wheel arch flares. 

Total 1979 production came to 178,819 (Volaré) and 121,354 (Aspen).

1980 
 
For its final year of production, and at the insistence of Lee Iacocca, the Volaré and Aspen were restyled. They gained new front styling (very similar to the Ford Fairmont) with a thin grille and rectangular headlamps. This was achieved by sharing the hood, fenders, and front bumper with the Dodge Diplomat. Premier and SE packages were available, but now only available on the sedan and coupe. The Volaré Duster trim package was also available for the 1980 model year. The R/T package was installed on 285 Aspens for this year.

The  V8 was dropped for 1980, leaving the  V8 as the top engine choice. The  slant six engine remained the base engine offering. The Super Six two-barrel carburetor option was dropped, leaving only the single-barrel, Holley 1945 carburetor for the venerable slant six engine. In this configuration, the slant six produced  at 3,600 rpm. 

Total production came to 67,318 (Aspen) and 90,063 (Volaré), though a significant portion of the sales were for fleet (police and taxi) use.

Volaré Road Runner / Aspen R/T 

The Plymouth Volaré Road Runner and the Dodge Aspen R/T coupes were the "performance" trim levels of the Volaré/Aspen models. They came with E70x14 tires, "rallye" wheels, a grille blackout treatment, body striping, and identifying decals and medallions. (The  V8 option was unavailable in California because the engine, which averaged  did not meet California fuel economy regulations.) The R/T also made a  run in 13.8 seconds. Unlike the 225 slant six and both the 318 and 360 "LA" V8s were not available with the four-speed overdrive transmission, only Chrysler Corporation's Model 727 three-speed automatic transmission.

Station wagons 
The Volaré/Aspen twins offered station wagon models that became the first domestic compact-sized competition for the AMC Hornet four-door "sportabout" wagon. The Volaré/Aspen wagons also featured a liftgate with a fixed rear window, rather than the more typical drop-down tailgate with roll-down rear window.

Side covers of the cargo area were made of one-piece injection molded polypropylene. Covered, lockable stowage compartments of  capacity were provided in these panels; these compartments were standard on the Volaré Premier and the Aspen SE, and optional on the low-line wagons.

Top-trim Volaré Premier and Aspen SE station wagon models featured simulated woodgrain on its exterior side panels. Volaré Premier wagons trimmed the "woodgrain" side panels with stainless steel frames accented in matte black; Aspen SE models offered frames that were simulated blond (painted metal) wood-look trim. Aside from the brand badging and grilles unique on each brand, this station wagon trim element remains one of the few visual clues that differentiated the Volaré from the Aspen.

Production Figures:

(For 1979, the coupe and sedan production figures are listed together)

International markets 
Between 1977 and 1979, the small Swiss specialty automaker Monteverdi built 20 modified versions of the Volaré/Aspen called the Sierra to compete in Europe's luxury car market.

The "Dart" name (rather than "Aspen") was applied to Dodge-branded F-platform cars in Mexico and Colombia, corresponding to the local Chrysler-branded F-platform cars badged as "Valiant Volarés". F-body Volaré models were not marketed under the "Plymouth" brand in Mexico because that brand was dropped after 1969.

During 1981 and 1982, Dart coupes built for the Mexican market used an M-platform Diplomat coupe that was fitted with a 1980 Volare header panel. Chrysler de México also sold less-expensive versions of the American K-cars: The Plymouth Reliant and Dodge Aries (in 1982–1987) and Plymouth Caravelle (1988) as "Chrysler Volarés".

The 1988 Chrysler Volaré E (an inexpensive version of the 1988 Plymouth Caravelle modified with a 1986–1988 Plymouth Reliant front end) served as Mexican Highway Patrol units from 1988 to 1990. They used Chrysler Turbo II 2.2 L engines and three-speed automatic transmissions (arm shifter on the steering columns, like U.S. patrol cars). In Mexico, they were known as "turbo-patrols".

The Volaré also became known as the "Volaré Duster" in Canada.

Recalls and reputation
The Volaré/Aspen were recalled numerous times; for the 1976 model year, there were at least eight serious recalls alone. 

They included:
 Potential failure of a component in the front suspension, which could cause the suspension to detach from the front subframe under hard braking;
 Possibility that the secondary hood latch could not properly hold the hood closed;
 Front brake lines, routed underneath the battery, that could corrode from spilled battery acid and lead to brake failure;
 Seat belts that could fail to latch during hard deceleration (such as an accident or hard braking), thereby preventing them from protecting the occupant;
 Misrouted fuel vapor line that could rub against the alternator drive belt, possibly resulting in a fire;
 Replacement of front fenders that corroded prematurely (sometimes in less than a year) because of an ill-advised cost-saving decision not to install front inner fender shields;
 At least one recall to address chronic stalling and driveability problems.

Chronic problems with stalling and poor driveability led to a horrible reputation that the Volaré/Aspen quickly gained as new buyers were to discover for themselves; premature rusting problems soon followed. In 1977, 1,300,000 Chrysler Corporation models were recalled for these driveability problems.

It is possible that much of the product-defect difficulty with the Volaré/Aspen models could have been avoided if Chrysler Corporation had taken more time to fully develop the cars before offering them to the market, but in an effort to boost sales and get a badly needed infusion of cash, Chrysler Corporation launched the Volaré/Aspen models as quickly as possible. This reputation for poor-build quality led to a decline in sales as the Volaré/Aspen twins became the most-recalled automobile models to date at that time. Winners of the Motor Trend Car of the Year, the Aspen and Volaré later received the Lemon of the Year award from the Center for Auto Safety, the consumer watchdog group founded by Ralph Nader.

Replacements for the Volaré/Aspen 
In 1980, the Volaré/Aspen cars were replaced with the front-wheel drive Plymouth Reliant and Dodge Aries for the 1981 model year. 

However, a new class of the F-platform emerged as the M-Body vehicles that included the Dodge Diplomat and Plymouth Gran Fury four-door sedans, which were very similar in structure, size, and engineering with the Aspen and Volaré.

The Aspen model name was revived in 2007 for the Chrysler Aspen luxury sport utility vehicle (SUV).

References 
Inline

General

External links
1976-'80 Dodge Aspen R/T- Hemmings

Aspen
Rear-wheel-drive vehicles
Compact cars
Coupés
Sedans
Station wagons
Cars introduced in 1976